Amt Barnim-Oderbruch is an Amt ("collective municipality") in the district of Märkisch-Oderland, in Brandenburg, Germany. Its seat is in Wriezen, itself not part of the Amt.

The Amt Barnim-Oderbruch consists of the following municipalities:
Bliesdorf
Neulewin
Neutrebbin
Oderaue
Prötzel
Reichenow-Möglin

Demography

References

Barnim-Oderbruch
Märkisch-Oderland